Felicia Raschiatore (born December 31, 1961) is a former professional tennis player from the United States.

Biography
Born in 1961, Raschiatore was coached by her father Felix from the age of 10. 

She attended Trinity University in Texas before competing professionally in the 1980s.

Noted performances in her professional career include finishing runner-up to Yvonne Vermaak at the 1983 Virginia Slims of Utah and a win over Virginia Ruzici, the top seed at the 1984 Virginia Slims of Denver.

As a doubles player she was a finalist at the 1984 Central Fidelity Banks International in Richmond and made the women's doubles quarter-finals at the 1984 French Open, partnering Camille Benjamin.

WTA Tour finals

Singles (0-1)

Doubles (0–1)

References

External links
 
 

1961 births
Living people
American female tennis players
Trinity Tigers women's tennis players